The Weather Guard Truck Race on Dirt is a NASCAR Craftsman Truck Series race at Bristol Motor Speedway with the track's concrete surface covered in dirt. The race is held on the same weekend as the NASCAR Cup Series' Food City Dirt Race.

History

In 2013, the Truck Series raced at Eldora Speedway in NASCAR's first dirt track race since 1970. Known as the Eldora Dirt Derby, the event ran from 2013 to 2019; it was canceled in 2020 due to the COVID-19 pandemic and was then removed from the 2021 schedule.

Bristol Motor Speedway, a half-mile concrete short track, had its surface covered by clay when it hosted the World of Outlaws dirt late model and sprint car tours in 2000 and 2001. Although successful with over 85,000 in average attendance, the race was canceled after its second year due to logistical difficulties: 14,000 truckloads of materials were needed to convert the track to dirt regulations, which resulted in damage to the streets outside, with 8,000 cubic feet of red clay being hauled in from a nearby farm for the surface. The track also had to be widened from 12 to 14 feet and the banking was reduced from 36 to 23 degrees.

On September 30, 2020, NASCAR revealed the 2021 Cup Series schedule, which featured a spring dirt race at Bristol that replaced the existing event on Bristol's normal concrete surface. The Truck Series followed suit in its schedule release on November 19, with the Pinty's Dirt Truck Race being one of two dirt events on the series calendar alongside a July round at Knoxville Raceway in Iowa. The event would run alongside the Cup Series dirt race; World of Outlaws events would also take place on the temporary dirt surface, which began to be laid down in early January 2021.

The 2021 race was originally scheduled for Saturday, March 27 with four heat races to determine the starting grid, but rain forced it to be pushed to Sunday. Rain had been in the forecast entering the weekend, prompting NASCAR to delay the heats on Saturday to deploy "packers"—vehicles like Ford Crown Victorias to pack the dirt together—and late models to test the surface's viability before starting the first heat; it only completed one lap before being halted due to mud accumulating on the trucks' windshields and grilles. Further rain and flash flooding on Sunday resulted in a second postponement to Monday.

On February 13, 2023, it was announced that Weather Guard would become the title sponsor of the Truck Series Bristol dirt race in 2023, replacing Pinty's.

Past winners

 2021: Race postponed from Saturday to Monday due to rain.

Manufacturer wins

References

External links
 

NASCAR Truck Series races
 
Annual sporting events in the United States